Paju Station is a railway station of the Gyeongui-Jungang Line in Paju-eup, Paju, Gyeonggi-do, South Korea.

History
 August 21, 1965: As a station-free batch station.
 Jan. 17, 1998: All services moved to the current station.
 June 1, 2000: The station was temporarily closed due to flood damage prevention work in Munsan District.
 July 1, 2009: The station became a part of Seoul Metropolitan Subway.

Station Layout

Around the station
Doowon Technical University College

References

External links

Seoul Metropolitan Subway stations
Railway stations opened in 1965
Metro stations in Paju